The Mysore's campaigns against the states of Malabar was the result of the Calicut's attack on Palghat in 1756–1757. This comprised the attacks of the Zamorin of Calicut on the Kingdom of Palakkad, situated east to Calicut. It  was a continuation of the attacks on the Kingdom of Valluvanad, the traditional rival of Calicut. In the one sided Valluvanad attacks the Zamorin had captured much of the land from Eranad to Nedunganad. So, this time Zamorin marched against Palakkad and easily occupied Nadvattom which tore the Kingdom of Palakkad right through the middle.

Komi Achan, the King of Palakkad, requested the faujdar of Dindigul, Hyder Ali to help him. Zamorin was fighting a war against Raja of Cochin at that time. Hyder Ali sent a massive force under his brother-in-law Makhdoom Ali and soon the allied forces swept through the Zamorin's territory and reached the sea coast. By these attacks, Hyder Ali also planned to capture the vast treasuries of Malabar kings which were obtained by the spice trade.

Zamorin came to a treaty with Haider Ali, in which he was demanded to pay twelve lack rupees as the war reparations. However, the Zamorin technically deceived Hyder Ali after the return of the Mysore Army from Malabar. But, for his role in these activities, Hyder Ali was rewarded by Devaraja, the Prime Minister of Mysore, with the jaghir (regional governorship) of Bangalore.

References

History of Kozhikode
Mysorean invasion of Malabar